is a New Zealand-born Japanese model and tarento. She is represented by the talent agency Oscar Promotion and is currently active in Tokyo. She is an exclusive model for the fashion magazine ViVi.

Career
In 2012, Fujita won the 13th Nicola Model Audition, then became an exclusive model for that magazine. She switched the magazine to Popteen from July 2014 issue. In April 2015, she was appointed as a fashion reporter for the news magazine show Mezamashi TV. The same year she was the most searched new model on Yahoo! Japan and won a special award for it. In July 2016, she made her drama debut in the Fuji Television's spin-off drama Suki na Hito ga Irukoto: Sama Sama Kyun Kyun Daisakusen, playing the lead role. 
She made her debut as a singer on August 3, 2016.

In August, 2017, Fujita left Popteen and joined Vivi as one of their exclusive models just 2 months after. The following year, she voice acted in the anime, Pokémon: Sun & Moon. She appeared in over 330 TV programs in 2017.

Her own fashion brand NiCORON was launched in 2018.

On February 23, 2019, Fujita started her YouTube channel, she began uploading videos in August of the same year and has over 500,000 followers as of September, 2019.

Personal life
She was influenced by late 2000s / early 2010s era Popteen models (such as Kumiko Funayama). She is of Polish and Russian descent on her father's side.

Discography

Singles
 Bye Bye (3 August 2016, Sony Music)

Appearances

Television
 Is There a Vet in the House? (NTV, 2014) as a guest appearance
 Pokémon the Series (Sun & Moon Season 3, voice roles), Female Pikachu (Kurin) (EP93), Stufful (since EP96)

Web dramas
 Suki na Hito ga Irukoto: Sama Sama Kyun Kyun Daisakusen (Fuji TV on demand, 2016)

Commercials
 Datsumō Labo (2016)

Music videos
 Sonar Pocket - Hero/Good Bye Taisetsu na Hito. (2015)

Events
 Shizuoka Collection (2015 A/W)
 Tokyo Girls Collection (2015 A/W, 2016 S/S)
 Girls Award (2015 A/W, 2016 S/S)

Bibliography

Magazines
 Nicola, Shinchosha 1997-, as an exclusive model from 2009 to April 2014
 Popteen, Kadokawa Haruki Corporation 1980-, as an exclusive model since June 2014

Books
 Nikorun Desu (Kadokawa Haruki Corporation, 1 December 2015)

Awards
 Nicola Model Audition (2009): Grand Prix
 Yahoo! Japan Search Award 2015: Won (Model Category)

References

External links 
  
 
  

1998 births
Living people
Japanese female models
Japanese idols
Japanese television personalities
Japanese people of Polish descent
Japanese people of Russian descent
Models from Saitama Prefecture
New Zealand people of Japanese descent
New Zealand people of Russian descent
New Zealand people of Polish descent
People from Auckland